The 1936 Campeonato Paulista da Primeira Divisão was the 35th season of São Paulo's top association football league. Two championships were disputed that season, each by a different league.

LPF Championship

In the edition organized by the LPF (Liga Paulista de Futebol), Palestra Itália won the title for the 7th time. no teams were relegated and the top scorer was Corinthians's Teleco with 28 goals.

System
The championship was disputed in a double round-robin system, with the winners of each round facing each other in the finals.

Championship

Finals

APEA Championship

In the edition organized by the APEA (Associação Paulista de Esportes Atléticos), Portuguesa won the title for the 2nd time. no teams were relegated and the top scorer was Portuguesa's Carioca with 18 goals.

System
The championship was disputed in a double round-robin system, with the team with the most points winning the title.

Championship

References

Campeonato Paulista seasons
Paulista